Richard L. "Rich" Anderson (born May 30, 1955) is an American politician. From 2010 through 2018 he served in the Virginia House of Delegates, representing the 51st district in the Prince William County suburbs of Washington, D.C. He is a member of the Republican Party. Anderson lost his reelection bid in Virginia's November 2017 election. Since 2020, Anderson serves as the Chairman of the Republican Party of Virginia.

Anderson chaired the House Committee on Science and Technology (2010–2017), and served on the House committees on Finance (2010–2017), General Laws (2010–2017), and Transportation (2012–2017).

Early life and career
Anderson was born in Roanoke, Virginia, and attended Northside High School there. He received a B.A. degree in political science from Virginia Tech in 1979.

Anderson was commissioned in the United States Air Force after graduation, serving as a nuclear missile operations officer in Titan II and Minuteman II intercontinental ballistic missile units, as well as other command and staff positions. He received an M.A. in public administration from Webster University in 1982. He also attended the Air War College, Air Command and Staff College and Armed Forces Staff College. He retired in 2009 in the rank of colonel. His wife, the former Ruth Valentine, also served in the U.S. Air Force for 21 years.

Anderson joined the Civil Air Patrol (CAP) as a cadet in 1969, and has been a CAP member since then. He served as National Commander with the CAP rank of brigadier general August 1993 – August 1996, and was chairman of the CAP Board of Governors February 2011 – February 2013.

Political career
After his U.S. Air Force retirement, Anderson entered politics, gaining the Republican nomination for the Virginia House of Delegates 51st district in the 2009 election. He defeated first-term Democrat Paul F. Nichols by less than two percentage points. Anderson ran unopposed in 2011, and defeated Democrat Reed Heddleston by roughly 2,000 votes in 2013. In 2015, Anderson ran unopposed for re-election to his fourth term in office.

Anderson was chair of the Virginia House Committee on Science and Technology.

Electoral history
After his U.S. Air Force retirement, Anderson entered politics, gaining the Republican nomination for the Virginia House of Delegates 51st district in the 2009 election. He defeated first-term Democrat Paul F. Nichols by less than two percentage points.

References

External links
 (campaign finance)

1955 births
21st-century American politicians
Living people
Republican Party members of the Virginia House of Delegates
National Commanders of the Civil Air Patrol
People from Woodbridge, Virginia
Politicians from Roanoke, Virginia
United States Air Force officers
Virginia Tech alumni
Webster University alumni
Republican Party of Virginia chairs